Kenneth Finlay McIver (26 October 1928 – 23 September 1988) was an Australian politician who served in the Parliament of Western Australia between 1968 and 1988. He represented Northam and Avon for the Labor Party. Prior to entering politics, McIver spent over 20 years as a train driver with the Western Australian Government Railways (WAGR). When the Fremantle line reopened in 1983, McIver drove the first passenger train along the line with Premier Brian Burke in the driver's cab with him. In recognition of his service to the WAGR and the parliament, McIver railway station was named in his honour.

References

1928 births
1988 deaths
Members of the Western Australian Legislative Assembly
Australian Labor Party members of the Parliament of Western Australia
People from Northam, Western Australia
20th-century Australian politicians